Cecilia Talangpaz (1693 - 1731) was a Kapampangan Filipino Roman Catholic figure. Along with her sister Dionisia Talangpaz, she established the "Beaterio de San Sebastian de Calumpang" (now the "Congregation of the Augustinian Recollect Sisters"), in 1719. The Augustinian Recollect Sisters is the second Filipino congregation of women religious founded in the Philippines, after the Religious of the Virgin Mary established by Venerable Ignacia del Espíritu Santo. Talangpaz beatification process is underway with protocol number: 2303

Religious life
Cecilia was born on July 16, 1693,  in Calumpit, Bulacan to half-Kapampangan parents. Together with her older sister Dionisia, they settled down near the shrine of the Our Lady of Mount Carmel in Manila. Their devout life attracted the attention of the Recollects who were taking care of the shrine and by July 1725, the sisters received the habit of tertiaries and were gathered in a beaterium.

San Sebastian Convent
The Talangpaz sisters went on to found the "Beaterio de San Sebastian de Calumpang". After years, they headed a congregation called "Augustinian Recollect Sisters".

Death
Cecilia died in 1731, followed by her sister Dionisia in 1732.

Beatification
On September 10, 1999, the causes for the beatification of the Talangpaz sisters were opened, bestowed with "Nulla Osta" and thereby giving them the titles "Servants of God."

References
 Hagiorgaphycircle website
 Kapangpangans website
 Recoletas website

1693 births
1731 deaths
18th-century venerated Christians
18th-century Filipino Roman Catholic nuns
Filipino Servants of God
Founders of Catholic religious communities
People from Bulacan